Żółkiewski family is a Polish magnate family of Lubicz coat of arms. The name derives from the village of Żółkiew, now Żółkiewka, Lublin Voivodeship.

Notable members
 Stanisław Żółkiewski (1547-1620), hetman, Great Chancellor of the Crown
 Katarzyna Żółkiewska (died 1616), daughter of Stanisław Żółkiewski, wife of Stanisław Koniecpolski
 Zofia Żółkiewska ( 1590–1634), daughter of Stanisław Żółkiewski, grandmother of King Jan III Sobieski.
 Stefan Żółkiewski (1911-1991), Polish communist

References